James "Bau" Graves is an American musician, musicologist, and arts activist. He is the former executive director of the Old Town School of Folk Music in Chicago. In 2005 his book on folk arts and community, Cultural Democracy: The Arts, Community, and the Public Purpose, was published.

Graves and his wife Phyllis O'Neill co-founded the Portland, Maine, Center for Cultural Exchange (formerly Portland Performing Arts Center) around 1982 and were co-directors until fall 2005.  The Center for Cultural Exchange described itself as being "dedicated to advancing cultural understanding through arts and education programs in collaboration with diverse communities and artists in Maine and throughout the world."  Graves was the artistic director and O'Neill was the executive director.  In November 2005, Graves became the president and executive director of Jefferson Center, a performance venue in Roanoke, Virginia, which was financially troubled at the time.  He left it in better financial condition than he found it, 14 months later, to become executive director of the Old Town School of Folk Music.

Graves' tenure at Old Town School of Folk Music was contentious. 
In early 2019, Graves retired from the organization.

References

American musicologists
Living people
Place of birth missing (living people)
Year of birth missing (living people)
American folk musicians